Joseph Cabell Breckinridge Sr. (January 14, 1842 – August 18, 1920) was a Union Army officer from Kentucky during the American Civil War. In later life, he became a brigadier general in the U.S. Regular Army and Inspector General of the Army as well as a major general of volunteers in the Spanish–American War.

Early life
Breckinridge was born in 1842, a member of the prominent Breckinridge family, in Baltimore, Maryland.  His parents were Anne Sophonisba (née Preston) Breckinridge (1803–1844) and Robert Jefferson Breckinridge (1800–1871), a Presbyterian minister, politician, public office holder and abolitionist who was one of the most distinguished divines and one of the most prolific writers of the century.  His father served as a leader of the Kentucky emancipation party in 1849 and was a strong Union man in 1861 at the outbreak of the Civil War.

His cousin, John C. Breckinridge, a Confederate major general and former Vice President of the United States, and his two oldest brothers fought for the Confederacy, while he and his second youngest brother Charles Henry Breckinridge fought for the Union.

Career

In August 1861, Breckinridge joined the U.S. Army and was appointed an aide-de-camp to George H. Thomas, and served with him at Mill Springs and Shiloh. While serving at Corinth, he was commissioned a lieutenant in the 2nd US Artillery. He served in the Atlanta Campaign, and was captured following the death of James B. McPherson. After being exchanged, he served out the remainder of the war as a mustering officer, and received brevet promotions to captain (July 1864) and major (March 1865). He received promotions to the full ranks of captain and major in 1874 and 1881 respectively.

On January 30, 1889, Breckinridge was promoted to brigadier general and Inspector General of the Army. He was promoted to Major General of volunteers in the Spanish–American War.  He served on the staff of V Corps in Cuba and was engaged in the battles of El Caney and San Juan Hill, where he had a horse shot from under him.

General Breckinridge retired from the Army on April 12, 1903, having been promoted to major general the day before.

Personal life
Major General Breckinridge was married to Louise Ludlow Dudley (1849–1911), daughter of Ethelbert Ludlow Dudley of Lexington, Kentucky in July 1868. Together, they were the parents of:

 Mary Dudley Breckinridge (1869–1939), who married John Fore Hines (1870–1941).
 Robert Jefferson Breckinridge (1871–1871), who died young.
 Joseph Cabell Breckinridge Jr. (1872–1898), who was washed overboard and drowned in Cuban waters while serving on the torpedo boat .
 Louise Dudley Breckinridge (1874–1874), who died young.
 Ethelbert Ludlow Dudley Breckinridge (1875–1914), who fought in the Philippine–American War and married Genevieve Pearson Mattingly (1878–1957).
 Mabell Warfield Breckinridge (1877–1878), who died young.
 Lucian Scott Breckinridge (1879–1941), who married Elinor Wilkinson (1879–1952).
 Scott Dudley Breckinridge (1882–1941), an Olympian and physician who married Gertrude Ashby Bayne (1883–1981).
 Charles Henry Preston Breckinridge (1884–1885), who died young.
 Henry Skillman Breckinridge (1886–1960), who served as the United States Assistant Secretary of War under President Woodrow Wilson.
 John P. Breckenridge (1890–1960).

General Breckinridge was a member of the Sons of the American Revolution (SAR).  He served as president of the District of Columbia Society in 1894 and as President General of the National Society of the SAR from 1900 until 1901. He was also a member of the Military Order of the Loyal Legion of the United States, Grand Army of the Republic and the Military Order of Foreign Wars.

Dates of rank
 2nd Lieutenant - 14 April 1862
 1st Lieutenant - 1 August 1863
 Brevet Major - 13 March 1865
 Captain - 17 June 1874
 Major - 19 January 1881
 Lieutenant Colonel - 5 February 1885
 Colonel - 22 September 1885
 Brigadier General - 30 January 1889
 Major General, Volunteers - 4 May 1898
 Mustered out of Volunteers - 30 May 1898
 Major General - 11 April 1903
 Retired - 12 April 1903

See also
 Breckinridge family in the American Civil War
 Kentucky in the American Civil War

References

External links

1842 births
1920 deaths
Military personnel from Baltimore
Military personnel from Lexington, Kentucky
United States Army generals
Inspectors General of the United States Army
Sons of the American Revolution
Breckinridge family
Southern Unionists in the American Civil War